Paul-Aloïse De Bock (13 September 1898 in Schaerbeek - 28 April 1986 in Watermael-Boitsfort) was  a French-speaking Belgian lawyer and writer.

De Bock won the Prix Victor-Rossel in 1953 for the collection of short stories Terres basses.

Works 
 Terres basses, 1953
 L'Antichambre, 1954
 L'Écume et le Soc, 1954
 Les Mains dans le vide, 1955
 Litanies pour des gisants, 1956
 Le Monologue conjugal, 1957
 Les Chemins de Rome, 1961
 Paul Delvaux, l'homme, le peintre, 1967
 Le Sucre filé, 1976
 Le Pénitent, 1981

Further reading

References 
 

Belgian writers in French
20th-century Belgian lawyers
Members of the Académie royale de langue et de littérature françaises de Belgique
1898 births
People from Schaerbeek
1986 deaths